Taita white-eye (Zosterops silvanus) is a species of bird in the family Zosteropidae. It includes numerous subspecies, sometimes considered a subspecies to montane white-eye (Z. poliogastrus). It is only found in Taita Hills in southeastern Kenya. IUCN categorizes it as vulnerable.

References

Zosterops
Birds of East Africa
Birds described in 1935